Nimmo is an historical town in Somalia. Located south of the capital Mogadishu, it consists of ruined stone houses and mosques. The Somali scholar Uways al-Barawi in the 19th century established a Madrassa here.

See also
Gondal
Abasa
Architecture of Somalia
Somali aristocratic and court titles

References
Neville Chittick, An Archaeological Reconnaissance of the Horn: The British-Somali Expedition, (1975)

Archaeological sites in Somalia
Former populated places in Somalia